Xie Fei (3 February 1913 – 14 February 2013) was a Chinese revolutionary and politician. She participated in the Long March and was the third wife of Liu Shaoqi.

Early life 
She was born Xie Qiongxiang in Wenchang, Hainan Province. She was a revolutionary from the age of 13, and became a member of the Chinese Communist Party in 1927. After exile to Hong Kong and undercover work in Singapore, she returned to China in 1932, where she worked in Fujian Province before going to Ruijin in 1934. In her time in Fujian, on several occasions she boiled and ate sensitive documents to keep them from Kuomintang agents, leading to lifelong stomach problems.

Chinese civil war 
Xie was one of thirty women participants of the Long March, 1934–1935. In October 1935, she married Liu Shaoqi, who later became Chairman of the People's Republic of China, as his third wife. Their marriage has been described as "brief, mysterious, and apparently childless," and ended in divorce in January 1939. or in 1941.

In 1937, Xie studied at the Central Party School of the Communist Party of China in Yan'an and then served as party functionary at various levels.

Later life 
After the establishment of the People's Republic of China in 1949, Xie became director of a special course at Renmin University of China and, in 1956, deputy principal of the Central Political and Legal Cadre School. She was sent to work on a pig farm in 1959. During the Cultural Revolution, Xie was imprisoned as a former close associate of Liu Shaoqi; she was rehabilitated in 1978. She became the deputy principal of the People's Public Security University of China and retired in February 2000. She died of illness in Beijing on 14 February 2013.

Notes

References

Sources 

1913 births
2013 deaths
Liu Shaoqi family
Chinese Communist Party politicians from Hainan
Spouses of Chinese politicians